Phidippus adumbratus is a species of jumping spider in the family Salticidae. It is found in the United States and Mexico.

Adumbratus is one of the insignarius group of Phidippus spiders. 

The etymology of the Latin name is from the adjective , meaning "secret, in the dark (perhaps alluding to the fact that the abdomen of the holotype is missing, and the describer was 'in the dark' as to its appearance)."

The type species was collected In Los Angeles, California and named in 1934.

A spider survey report published in 2022 found individuals in Baja California's Central Desert ecoregion in Sierra Blanca, Municipio de Ensenada, Mesa Escondido and San Antonio de Las Minas on the Baja California peninsula.

References

Further reading

 
 
 
 

Salticidae
Spiders described in 1934